Austin David Adams (born August 19, 1986) is an American professional baseball pitcher who is a free agent. He has previously played in Major League Baseball (MLB) for the Cleveland Indians, Minnesota Twins, and Detroit Tigers.

Amateur career
Adams attended Stanhope Elmore High School in Millbrook, Alabama and played college baseball for Faulkner University. With Faulkner, he played shortstop and pitched; as a shortstop he had a .372 batting average with 29 home runs. In 2008, he played collegiate summer baseball with the Hyannis Mets of the Cape Cod Baseball League.

Professional career

Cleveland Indians
He was selected by the Cleveland Indians in the 2009 MLB draft. He began his minor league career with the Mahoning Valley Scrappers of the Class A-Short Season New York–Penn League. In 17 games, he had a win–loss record of 3–1 and an earned run average (ERA) of 4.86. The following season, he pitched for the Lake County Captains of the Class A Midwest League and the Kinston Indians of the Class A-Advanced Carolina League. Adams pitched in 13 games each for the two squads, and with Kinston he had a 6–1 record and a 1.53 ERA. Between both teams, he had 112 strikeouts in 112 innings pitched.

In 2011, Adams spent the season with the Akron Aeros of the Class AA Eastern League, where he had an 11–10 record, a 3.77 ERA, and 131 strikeouts in 26 appearances. He was invited to spring training with the Indians the following year, but suffered a shoulder injury. He had surgery on it in may of that year, and missed the 2012 season. In 2013, the Indians converted him into a relief pitcher and assigned him to the Aeros for the season. He had a 2.62 ERA and 76 strikeouts in 45 games; the Indians added him to their 40-man roster after the season.

Adams began the 2014 season with the Columbus Clippers of the Class AAA International League, and spent the first three months of the season with them. He was promoted to the Indians on July 11 after pitching in 30 games for the Clippers, and he made his major league debut the following day. Adams made 28 appearances for the Indians in 2015, compiling a 3.78 ERA and earning 1 save. On February 7, 2017, Adams was designated for assignment by the Indians.

Los Angeles Angels
On February 10, 2017, the Indians traded Adams to the Los Angeles Angels for a player to be named later or cash considerations. He was designated for assignment on April 2, 2017. On April 5, he was outrighted from the 40-man roster, and optioned to the Triple-A Salt Lake Bees. He elected free agency on November 6, 2017.

Sugar Land Skeeters
On June 1, 2018, Adams signed with the Sugar Land Skeeters of the Atlantic League of Professional Baseball.

Minnesota Twins
On August 19, 2018, Adams's contract was purchased by the Minnesota Twins, and he was assigned to the Double-A Chattanooga Lookouts. He opened the 2019 season with the Rochester Red Wings. On May 16, his contract was selected and he was called up to the major league roster. he made his Twins debut on May 18 and pitched 2 scoreless innings.

Detroit Tigers
On May 26, 2019, the Detroit Tigers claimed Adams off waivers after the Twins designated him for assignment. He made his Tigers debut on June 1. On July 7, he was designated for assignment. He appeared in 13 games, pitching to a 5.14 ERA. He elected free agency on September 30.

Minnesota Twins (second stint)
On January 28, 2020, Adams signed a minor league deal with the Minnesota Twins organization. Adams did not play in a game in 2020 due to the cancellation of the minor league season because of the COVID-19 pandemic. On November 2, he elected free agency.

Lexington Legends
On July 5, 2021, Adams signed with the Lexington Legends of the Atlantic League of Professional Baseball. Adams made 36 appearances for Lexington in 2021, posting a 4–4 record and 2.68 ERA with 8 saves and 36 strikeouts in 37.0 innings pitched. Adams struggled in 2022, pitching to a 5.46 ERA while collecting 14 saves and 40 strikeouts in 31.1 innings of work. He was released by the Legends on August 2, 2022.

References

External links

Living people
1986 births
People from Millbrook, Alabama
Baseball players from Alabama
Major League Baseball pitchers
Cleveland Indians players
Detroit Tigers players
Minnesota Twins players
Faulkner Eagles baseball players
Mahoning Valley Scrappers players
Lake County Captains players
Kinston Indians players
Akron Aeros players
Columbus Clippers players
Faulkner State Community College alumni
People from Montgomery County, Alabama
Salt Lake Bees players
Orem Owlz players
Sugar Land Skeeters players
Chattanooga Lookouts players
Rochester Red Wings players
Toledo Mud Hens players
Hyannis Harbor Hawks players
Lexington Legends players